The 1908 Nashville Vols season was the 15th season of minor league baseball in Nashville, Tennessee, and the Nashville Vols' 8th season in the Southern Association. The Vols finished the previous season in last place, but this year won the league pennant, by defeating he New Orleans Pelicans 1-0 on the last day of the season in a game dubbed by Grantland Rice "The Greatest Game Ever Played In Dixie."

This is also the season Rice dubbed the ballpark Sulphur Dell. The team's player-manager was Bill Bernhard. The team featured just two players from Tennessee: Pryor McElveen and Hub Perdue. First baseman Jake Daubert led the league in home runs with six.

Before the season 
The Vols finished last place in the Southern Association in 1907. A new group of men purchased the team, including Ferdinand E. Kuhn, James B. Carr, Thomas James Tyne, J. T. Connor, James A. Bowling, Robert L. Bolling, Rufus E. Fort, and William G. Hirsig. Well known attorney S. A. Champion supplied legal services. The group envisioned an ambitious project of stadium renovations at Sulphur Dell, and managed to cull $50,000. Kuhn was selected to head the Board of Directors. He went on a trip to Ponce de Leon Park in Atlanta to observe a modern park and plan renovations.

Kuhn hired Bill Bernhard as manager.

Schedule

Game log 

|- style="text-align:center; background-color:#fbb;"
| 1 || April 16 || @ Atlanta|| 1–3 ||Ford (1–0) || Sorrell (0–1) ||  ||Ponce de Leon Park|| 6,000 || 0–1 || L1
|- style="text-align:center; background-color:#bfb;"
| 2 || April 17 || @ Atlanta || 3–0 ||Duggan (1–0) ||Castleton (0–1) ||  || Ponce de Leon Park|| 3,000 || 1–1 || W1
|- style="text-align:center; background-color:#bbb;"
|  || April 20|| Montgomery|| 3–3 ||  ||  || — ||Sulphur Dell|| 4,400 || 1–1 || W1
|- style="text-align:center; background-color:#fbb;"
| 3 || April 21 || Montgomery|| 1–5 ||Van Ada|| Sorrell (0–2)|| — ||Sulphur Dell|| 2,000 || 1–2 || L1
|- style="text-align:center; background-color:#fbb;"
| 4 || April 22 || Montgomery|| 5–6 ||Cristall|| Duggan (1–1)|| — ||Sulphur Dell|| 1,500 || 1–3|| L2
|- style="text-align:center; background-color:#bfb;"
| 5 || April 23 || Montgomery|| 4–2 ||Perdue (1–0)|| Helm|| — ||Sulphur Dell|| 1,500 || 2–3|| W1
|- style="text-align:center; background-color:#bfb;"
| 6|| April 25 || Birmingham|| 3–0 ||Hess (1–0)||Robitaille|| — ||Sulphur Dell|| 3,000 || 3–3|| W2
|- style="text-align:center; background-color:#bfb;"
| 7 || April 27 ||Birmingham|| 7–6 ||Hunter (1–0)||McNeal|| — ||Sulphur Dell||| 1,500 || 4–3|| W3
|- style="text-align:center; background-color:#fbb"
| 8 || April 28||Birmingham|| 1–4 ||Fleharty|| Duggan (1–2)|| — ||Sulphur Dell|| 1,500 || 4–4|| L1
|- style="text-align:center; background-color:#fbb"
| 9 || April 29 || @ Montgomery|| 1–4 ||Thomas|| Perdue (1–1)|| — || || || 4–5|| L2
|- style="text-align:center; background-color:#fbb"
| 10 ||April 30 || @ Montgomery|| 1–4 ||Stackpole|| Hess (1–1)|| — || || || 4–6|| L3
|-

|- style="text-align:center; background-color:#bfb"
| 11 || May 1 ||@ Montgomery || 5–0 ||Kellum (1–0) || Merriman || ||  || || 5–6 || W1
|- style="text-align:center; background-color:#fbb"
| 12 || May 2 || |@ Montgomery || 1–3 ||  ||  || ||  || || 5–7 || L1
|- style="text-align:center; background-color:#bfb;"
| 13 || May 4 ||@ Birmingham || 3–1 ||Duggan (2–2) || McNeal||  ||  ||  || 6–7 || W1
|- style="text-align:center; background-color:#fbb;"
| 14|| May 7 || @ Birmingham || 1–4 || Turner ||Perdue (1–2)||  ||  || 450 || 6–8 || L1
|- style="text-align:center; background-color:#fbb;"
| 15 || May 8 || Atlanta || 1–4 || Ford ||Hess (1–2) || — ||Sulphur Dell||  || 6–9 || L2
|- style="text-align:center; background-color:#bfb;"
| 16 || May 9 || Atlanta || 2–1 ||Kellum (2–0) ||McKenzie || — ||Sulphur Dell|| 1,500 || 7–9 || W1
|- style="text-align:center; background-color:#bfb;"
| 17 || May 11 || Atlanta || 4–2 ||Yerkes (1–0) ||Cummings || — ||Sulphur Dell||1,500 || 8–9 || W2
|- style="text-align:center; background-color:#fbb;"
| 18 || May 12|| Atlanta || 5–6 || Ford ||Duggan (2–3) || — ||Sulphur Dell||2.000 || 8–10 || L1
|- style="text-align:center; background-color:#bfb;"
| 19 || May 14|| @ Memphis || 6–2 ||Duggan (3–3) || Chappelle ||  ||Russwood Park||  || 9–10 || W1
|- style="text-align:center; background-color:#bfb;"
| 20|| May 15|| @ Memphis || 5–1 ||Hess (2–2) || Savidge ||  || Russwood Park||  || 10–10 || W2
|- style="text-align:center; background-color:#bfb;"
| 21|| May 16 || @ Memphis || 3–2 ||Hunter (2–1) || Garrity ||  || Russwood Park||  || 11–10 || W3
|- style="text-align:center; background-color:#bfb;"
| 22 || May 18 ||@ Little Rock || 5–3 ||Perdue (2–2) || Connelly ||  || ||  || 12–10 || W4
|- style="text-align:center; background-color:#fbb"
| 23 || May 19|| @ Little Rock || 1–3 || Hart||Kellum (2–1) ||  || ||  || 12–11 || L1
|- style="text-align:center; background-color:#fbb"
| 24 || May 20 ||@ Little Rock || 1–10 || Eyler ||Hess (2–3) ||  || ||  || 12–12 || L2
|- style="text-align:center; background-color:#bbb"
|  || May 21 || @ New Orleans || 0–0 ||  ||  ||  ||   Athletic Park ||  || 12–12 || L2
|- style="text-align:center; background-color:#fbb"
| 25 || May 22 || @ New Orleans || 1–4 || Bartley ||Hunter (2–2) ||  ||Athletic Park ||  || 12–13 || L3
|- style="text-align:center; background-color:#fbb"
| 26 || May 23 || @ New Orleans || 1–10 ||Guese ||Perdue (2–3) ||  || Athletic Park ||  || 12–14 || L4
|- style="text-align:center; background-color:#fbb"
| 27 || May 24 || @ New Orleans ||0–5 ||Bartley ||Hess (2–4) ||  ||Athletic Park  ||  || 12–15 || L5
|- style="text-align:center; background-color:#bfb"
| 28 || May 25 ||@ Mobile|| 2–1 ||Kellum (3–1) || Torrey ||  || Monroe Park ||  || 13–15 || W1
|- style="text-align:center; background-color:#bfb;"
| 29 || May 26 ||@ Mobile|| 10–4 ||Duggan (4–3) || Beeker||  || Monroe Park  ||  || 14–15 || W2
|- style="text-align:center; background-color:#bfb;"
| 30|| May 29 || Memphis|| 9–1 ||Hunter (3–2) || Garrity||  ||Sulphur Dell||3,000 || 15–15 || W3
|- style="text-align:center; background-color:#fbb;"
| 31 || May 30 || Memphis|| 0–1 || Savidge ||Duggan (4–4)||  ||Sulphur Dell|| 4,000|| 15–16 || L1
|- style="text-align:center; background-color:#fbb"
| 32 || May 30 || Memphis|| 2–5 ||Chappelle ||Hess (2–5)||  ||Sulphur Dell||  || 15–17 || L2
|- style="text-align:center; background-color:#fbb"
| 33 || May 31 || @ Memphis|| 1–4 || Shields ||Perdue  (2–4)||  || Russwood Park ||  || 15–18 || L3
|-

|- style="text-align:center; background-color:#bfb;"
| 34 || June 1 || Memphis|| 3–1 ||Kellum (4–1) || Garrity || — ||Sulphur Dell|| 1,500 || 16–18 || W1
|- style="text-align:center; background-color:#fbb;"
| 35 || June 2 ||New Orleans|| 2–5 || Guese ||Yerkes (1–2)|| — ||Sulphur Dell|| 1,800 || 16–19 || L1
|- style="text-align:center; background-color:#bfb;"
| 36 || June 4 || New Orleans|| 3–2 ||Duggan (5–4) || Clark|| — ||Sulphur Dell|| 1,500 || 17–19 || W1
|- style="text-align:center; background-color:#bfb"
| 37 || June 5|| New Orleans|| 5–2 ||Duggan (6–4) || Bartley|| — ||Sulphur Dell|| 1,800 || 18–19 || W2
|- style="text-align:center; background-color:#fbb"
| 38 || June 6|| Mobile || 2–5 || Beeker ||Kellum (4–2) || — ||Sulphur Dell|| 2,800|| 18–20 || L1
|- style="text-align:center; background-color:#bfb"
| 39 || June 8 || Mobile || 8–1 ||Perdue (3–4) || Torrey || — ||Sulphur Dell|| 1,400|| 19–20 || W1
|- style="text-align:center; background-color:#fbb"
| 40 || June 9 || Mobile || 1–3 ||Stockdale ||Yerkes (1–3)|| — ||Sulphur Dell|| 1,500|| 19–21 || L1
|- style="text-align:center; background-color:#bfb"
| 41 || June 10 || Mobile || 3–0 ||Duggan (7–4) ||Beeker || — ||Sulphur Dell|| 1,200|| 20–21 || W1
|- style="text-align:center; background-color:#fbb"
| 42 || June 11 ||Little Rock || 2–8 ||Eyler ||Bernhard (0–1) || — ||Sulphur Dell|| 1,599|| 20–22 || L1
|- style="text-align:center; background-color:#bfb;"
| 43 || June 12 ||Little Rock || 7–0 ||Perdue (4–4) ||Walters || — ||Sulphur Dell|| 1,200|| 21–22 || W1
|- style="text-align:center; background-color:#fbb;"
| 44 || June 13 ||Little Rock || 1–8 ||Eastman ||Kellum (4–3) || — ||Sulphur Dell|| 1,500|| 21–23 || L1
|- style="text-align:center; background-color:#fbb;"
| 45 || June 15 ||Birmingham || 0–6 ||Robitaille ||Duggan (7–5) || — ||Sulphur Dell|| 1,100|| 21–24 || L2
|- style="text-align:center; background-color:#bfb;"
| 46 || June 16 || Birmingham || 5–3 ||Perdue (5–4) ||Turner || — ||Sulphur Dell|| 1,300|| 22–24|| W1
|- style="text-align:center; background-color:#bfb;"
| 47 || June 17 || Birmingham || 6–0 ||Kellum (5–3)||Robinson|| — ||Sulphur Dell|| 1,500|| 23–24 || W2
|- style="text-align:center; background-color:#bfb;"
| 48 || June 18 || Montgomery || 5–1 ||Bernhard (1–1)||Cristall|| — ||Sulphur Dell|| 1,500|| 24–24 || W3
|- style="text-align:center; background-color:#bfb;"
|49 || June 19 || Montgomery || 7–2 ||Duggan (8–5)||Guese|| — ||Sulphur Dell|| 1,500|| 25–24 || W4
|- style="text-align:center; background-color:#bfb;"
| 50 || June 20 || Montgomery || 8–0 ||Perdue (6–4) ||Juul|| — ||Sulphur Dell|| 3,000|| 26–24 || W5
|- style="text-align:center; background-color:#bfb;"
|51 || June 22 || @ Atlanta || 5–4 ||Kellum (6–3)||Schopp|| — || Ponce de Leon Park || ||27–24 || W6
|- style="text-align:center; background-color:#bfb;"
| 52 || June 23 || @ Atlanta || 5–1 ||Perdue (7–4) || || — ||  Ponce de Leon Park || ||28–24 || W7
|- style="text-align:center; background-color:#fbb"
| 53 || June 23 || @ Atlanta || 1–4 ||Castleton ||Duggan (8–6)|| — || Ponce de Leon Park || ||28–25 || L1
|- style="text-align:center; background-color:#fbb"
| 54 || June 24 || @ Atlanta || 0–5||Ford ||Bernhard (1–2)|| — || Ponce de Leon Park || ||28–26 || L2
|- style="text-align:center; background-color:#fbb"
|55 || June 25 || @ Montgomery || 3–4 ||Guese ||Kellum (6–4)|| — ||  ||  || 28–27 || L3
|- style="text-align:center; background-color:#fbb"
| 56 || June 26 ||@ Montgomery || 1–2 ||Thomas ||Perdue (7–5)|| — ||  ||  || 28–28 || L4
|- style="text-align:center; background-color:#bfb"
| 57 || June 27 ||@ Montgomery || 3–2 ||Duggan (9–6) ||McCafferty || — ||  ||  || 29–28 || W1
|- style="text-align:center; background-color:#bfb"
| 58 || June 30 || Atlanta || 3–1 ||Duggan (10–6) ||Ford || — ||Sulphur Dell|| 1,500||30–28 || W2
|-

|- style="text-align:center; background-color:#bfb;"
| 59 || July 1 || Atlanta || 5–0 ||Perdue (8–5) || Schopp || — ||Sulphur Dell||1,600 || 30–28 || W3
|- style="text-align:center; background-color:#bfb"
| 60 || July 3 || @ Birmingham || 5–2||Kellum (7–4) ||  || — ||  ||  || 31–28 || W4
|- style="text-align:center; background-color:#bfb"
| 61 || July 4 ||@ Birmingham || 5–2||Duggan (11–6) ||  || — ||  || 1,500|| 32–28 || W5
|- style="text-align:center; background-color:#fbb"
| 62 || July 5 || @ New Orleans || 1–2|| Clark ||Perdue (8–6) || — || Athletic Park ||  || 32–29 || L1
|- style="text-align:center; background-color:#bfb;"
| 63 || July 6 ||@ New Orleans || 2–0||Kellum (8–4) ||Breitenstein|| — ||  Athletic Park||  || 33–29 || W1
|- style="text-align:center; background-color:#bfb;"
| 64 || July 7 ||@ New Orleans || 3–1||Duggan (12–6) ||Bartley || — || Athletic Park ||  || 34–29 || W2
|- style="text-align:center; background-color:#bbb;"
|  || July 9 || @ Mobile || 0–0||  || || — || Monroe Park  ||  || 34–29 || W2
|- style="text-align:center; background-color:#bfb;"
| 65 || July 10 || @ Mobile || 3–2||Hunter (3–3) ||Gaskill|| — || Monroe Park  ||  || 35–29|| W3
|- style="text-align:center; background-color:#fbb"
| 66 || July 11 || @ Mobile || 1–2|| Hickman ||Kellum (8–5)|| — ||Monroe Park   ||  || 35–30 || L1
|- style="text-align:center; background-color:#bfb"
| 67 || July 12 || @ Mobile || 6–3||Bernhard (2–2)||Gaskill|| — || Monroe Park  ||  || 36–30 || W1
|- style="text-align:center; background-color:#bbb"
|  || July 13 || @ Little Rock || 3–3||  ||  || — ||  ||  || 36–30 || W1
|- style="text-align:center; background-color:#fbb"
| 68 || July 14 || @ Little Rock || 1–4|| Hart||Hunter (4–3)|| — ||  ||  || 36–31 || L1
|- style="text-align:center; background-color:#fbb"
| 69 || July 15 ||@ Little Rock || 1–2|| Eastman||Duggan (12–7)|| — ||  ||  || 36–32 || L2
|- style="text-align:center; background-color:#bfb"
| 70 || July 15 ||@ Little Rock || 5–4||Kellum (9–5)||Buchanan|| — ||  ||  || 37–32 || W1
|- style="text-align:center; background-color:#bfb"
| 71 || July 17 || @ Memphis || 3–2||Perdue (9–6)||Chappelle|| — || Russwood Park ||  || 38–32 || W2
|- style="text-align:center; background-color:#bfb;"
| 72 || July 18 || @ Memphis || 6–1||Bernhard (3–2)||Shields|| — || Russwood Park ||  || 39–32 || W3
|- style="text-align:center; background-color:#bfb;"
| 73 || July 20|| Little Rock || 2–1||Duggan (13–7)||Neuer|| — ||Sulphur Dell||3,000 || 40–32 || W4
|- style="text-align:center; background-color:#fbb;"
| 74 || July 21 ||Little Rock || 0–3||Buchanan||Perdue (9–7)|| — ||Sulphur Dell||  || 40–33 || L1
|- style="text-align:center; background-color:#bfb;"
| 75 || July 22 || Little Rock || 15–8||Hunter (5–3)||  || — ||Sulphur Dell||  || 41–33 || W1
|- style="text-align:center; background-color:#fbb"
| 76 || July 23 || Mobile || 0–2||Hickman||Kellum (9–6) || — ||Sulphur Dell||  || 41–34 || L1
|- style="text-align:center; background-color:#bfb"
| 77 || July 25 || Mobile || 4–2||Perdue (10–7)||Torrey || — ||Sulphur Dell||1,800 || 42–35|| W1
|- style="text-align:center; background-color:#bfb"
| 78 || July 26 ||@ Memphis || 2–1||Bernhard (4–2)||Garrity|| — ||  ||  || 43–35 || W2
|- style="text-align:center; background-color:#bfb"
| 79 || July 27 ||New Orleans|| 3–1||Kellum (10–6)||Bartley|| — ||Sulphur Dell|| 3,000|| 44–35 || W3
|- style="text-align:center; background-color:#fbb"
|80 || July 28 || New Orleans|| 5–7||Clark||Hunter (5–4)|| — ||Sulphur Dell|| 3,500|| 44–36|| L1
|- style="text-align:center; background-color:#bfb"
| 81 || July 29 || New Orleans|| 2–0||Bernhard (5–2)||Fritz|| — ||Sulphur Dell|| 2,500|| 45–36|| W1
|- style="text-align:center; background-color:#fbb"
| 82 || July 30 || Memphis || 2–5|| ||Perdue (10–8)|| — ||Sulphur Dell||2,000 || 45–37 || L1
|- style="text-align:center; background-color:#fbb"
| 83 || July 31 || Memphis || 0–1||Savidge||Duggan (13–8)||— ||Sulphur Dell||1,800 || 45–38 || L2
|-

|- style="text-align:center; background-color:#bfb"
| 84 || August 1 || Memphis || 3–0 ||Kellum (11–6) || Schwenk ||  ||Sulphur Dell|| 3,500 || 46–38 || W1
|- style="text-align:center; background-color:#fbb"
| 85 || August 3 || Birmingham || 2–6 || Bauer ||Perdue (10–9) ||  ||Sulphur Dell|| 1,400 || 46–39 || L1
|- style="text-align:center; background-color:#bfb"
| 86 || August 4 || Birmingham || 15–2 ||Hunter (6–4) || Robitaille ||  ||Sulphur Dell|| 2,000 || 47–39 || W1
|- style="text-align:center; background-color:#bfb"
| 87 || August 5 || Birmingham || 13–1 ||Kellum (12–6) || Ford ||  ||Sulphur Dell|| 2,000 || 48–39 || W2
|- style="text-align:center; background-color:#fbb"
| 88 || August 5 || Birmingham || 4–5 || Turner||Duggan (13–9) ||  ||Sulphur Dell||  || 48–40 || L1
|- style="text-align:center; background-color:#bfb;"
| 89 || August 6 || Atlanta|| 6–0 ||Bernhard (6–2)||Radabaugh ||  ||Sulphur Dell|| 2,000|| 49–40 || W1
|- style="text-align:center; background-color:#bfb;"
| 90 || August 7 || Atlanta|| 2–1 ||Sitton (1–0)||Maxwell ||  ||Sulphur Dell|| 3,500|| 50–40 || W2
|- style="text-align:center; background-color:#bfb;"
| 91 || August 8 || Atlanta|| 2–0 ||Hunter (7–4)||Viebahn||  ||Sulphur Dell|| || 51–40 || W3
|- style="text-align:center; background-color:#bfb;"
| 92 || August 10|| Montgomery|| 6–1 ||Duggan (14–9)||Bliss||  ||Sulphur Dell||2,400|| 52–40 || W4
|- style="text-align:center; background-color:#fbb;"
| 93 || August 11 || Montgomery|| 1–3 || Guese||Kellum (12–7) ||  ||Sulphur Dell||  || 52–41 || L1
|- style="text-align:center; background-color:#bfb;"
| 94 || August 12 || Montgomery|| 1–0 ||Bernhard (7–2)|| Thomas ||  ||Sulphur Dell|| 2,500|| 53–41 || W1
|- style="text-align:center; background-color:#fbb;"
| 95 || August 13 || @ Atlanta|| 2–5 || Viebahn||Hunter (7–5)||  || Ponce de Leon Park ||  || 53–42 || L1
|- style="text-align:center; background-color:#bfb;"
| 96 || August 14 || @ Atlanta|| 5–1 ||Sitton (2–0)|| Ford||  || Ponce de Leon Park ||  || 54–42 || W1
|- style="text-align:center; background-color:#fbb;"
| 97 || August 14 || @ Atlanta|| 2–3 || Johns||Duggan (14–10)||  || Ponce de Leon Park ||  || 54–43 || L1
|- style="text-align:center; background-color:#bfb;"
| 98|| August 15 || @ Atlanta|| 3–1 ||Kellum (13–7)||Maxwell||  || Ponce de Leon Park ||  || 55–43 || W1
|- style="text-align:center; background-color:#fbb"
| 99 || August 17 || @ Montgomery|| 3–8 || Thomas||Sitton (2–1)||  ||  ||  || 55–44|| L1
|- style="text-align:center; background-color:#bfb"
| 100 || August 18 ||@ Montgomery|| 11–6 ||Perdue (11–9)||Juul||  ||  ||  || 56–44|| W1
|- style="text-align:center; background-color:#bfb"
| 101 || August 19 || @ Montgomery|| 6–3 ||Bernhard (8–2)||Guese||  ||  ||  || 57–44|| W2
|- style="text-align:center; background-color:#bbb"
|  || August 20 || @ Birmingham|| 1–1 ||  || ||  ||  ||  || 57–44|| W2
|- style="text-align:center; background-color:#fbb"
| 102 || August 21 || @ Birmingham||2–6 || Ford||Kellum (13–8)||  ||  ||  || 57–45|| L1
|- style="text-align:center; background-color:#fbb"
| 103 || August 21 || @ Birmingham|| 4–5 || Thomas||Sitton (2–1)||  ||  ||  || 57–46|| L2
|- style="text-align:center; background-color:#bfb"
| 104 || August 22 ||@ Birmingham|| 3–1 ||Perdue (12–9)|| Robitaille||  ||  ||  || 58–46|| W1
|- style="text-align:center; background-color:#fbb"
| 105 || August 22 ||@ Birmingham|| 0–7 || Fleharty||Perdue (12–10)||  ||  ||  || 58–47|| L1
|- style="text-align:center; background-color:#fbb"
| 106 || August 24 || @ Little Rock|| 1–2|| Eyler||Bernhard (8–3)||  ||  ||  || 58–48|| L2
|- style="text-align:center; background-color:#bfb;"
| 107 || August 25 || @ Little Rock|| 5–3||Duggan (15–10)|| Eastman||  ||  ||  || 59–48|| W1
|- style="text-align:center; background-color:#bfb;"
| 108 || August 26 || @ Little Rock|| 4–0||Perdue (13–10)||Buchanan||  ||  ||  || 60–48|| W2
|- style="text-align:center; background-color:#bfb"
| 109 || August 26 ||@ Little Rock|| 3–2||Kellum (14–8)|| Hart||  ||  ||  || 61–48|| W3
|- style="text-align:center; background-color:#fbb"
| 110 || August 28 || @ Memphis|| 1–2|| Schwenk||Sitton (2–3) ||  ||Russwood Park ||  || 61–49|| L1
|- style="text-align:center; background-color:#fbb;"
| 111 || August 29 || @ Memphis|| 1–5|| Savidge||Bernhard (8–4)||  ||Russwood Park ||  || 61–50|| L2
|- style="text-align:center; background-color:#bbb;"
|  || August 30 ||@ Memphis|| 2–2|| || ||  ||Russwood Park ||5,000 || 61–50|| L2
|- style="text-align:center; background-color:#bfb;"
| 112 || August 31 ||@ New Orleans || 2–0 ||Kellum (15–8) ||Bartley || — ||Athletic Park  || 3,300 || 62–50 || W1
|-

|- style="text-align:center; background-color:#bfb;"
| 113 || September 1 || @ New Orleans || 1–0 ||Sitton (3–3) || Fritz || — || Athletic Park || 3,500 || 63–50 || W2
|- style="text-align:center; background-color:#fbb;"
| 114 || September 2 || @ New Orleans || 0–3 || Breitenstein ||Duggan  (15–11) || — || Athletic Park || 3,500 || 63–51 || L1
|- style="text-align:center; background-color:#bbb;"
|  || September 2 || @ New Orleans || 0–0 ||  ||  || — || Athletic Park ||  || 63–51 || L1
|- style="text-align:center; background-color:#fbb;"
| 115 || September 3 || @ Mobile || 0–1 || Hickman||Perdue (13–11) || — || Monroe Park  ||  || 63–52 || L2
|- style="text-align:center; background-color:#bfb;"
| 116 || September 3 || @ Mobile || 2–0 ||Perdue (14–11)||Hixon|| — ||  Monroe Park ||  || 64–52 || W1
|- style="text-align:center; background-color:#fbb;"
| 117 || September 5 || @ Mobile || 1–4 || Fisher||Kellum (15–9)|| — || Monroe Park  ||  || 64–53 || L1
|- style="text-align:center; background-color:#bfb;"
| 118 || September 5 || @ Mobile || 10–0 ||Hunter (8–5)|| || — || Monroe Park  ||  || 65–53 || W1
|- style="text-align:center; background-color:#fbb"
| 119 || September 7 ||Memphis || 1–4 || Schwenk ||Sitton (3–4) ||  ||Sulphur Dell|| 3,500 || 65–54 || L1
|- style="text-align:center; background-color:#bfb"
| 120 || September 7 || Memphis|| 6–3 ||Duggan (16–11) || Garrity ||  ||Sulphur Dell|| 7,500 || 66–54 || W1
|- style="text-align:center; background-color:#bfb"
| 121 || September 8 || Memphis|| 10–0 ||Perdue (15–11) || Savidge ||  ||Sulphur Dell||  || 67–54 || W2
|- style="text-align:center; background-color:#fbb"
| 122 || September 9 ||Little Rock|| 2–3||Hart ||Kellum (15–10) ||  ||Sulphur Dell||  || 67–55|| L1
|- style="text-align:center; background-color:#bfb"
| 123 || September 10 || Little Rock|| 1–0||Duggan (17–11) || Buchanan ||  ||Sulphur Dell||  || 68–55|| W1
|- style="text-align:center; background-color:#bfb"
| 124 || September 11 || Little Rock|| 20–1||Sitton (4–4) ||  ||  ||Sulphur Dell||  || 69–55|| W2
|- style="text-align:center; background-color:#bfb"
| 125 || September 12 || Little Rock|| 11–1||Perdue (16–11) || Hart||  ||Sulphur Dell||  || 70–55|| W3
|- style="text-align:center; background-color:#bfb"
| 126 || September 14 || Mobile|| 10–2||Duggan (18–11) || Beeker ||  ||Sulphur Dell||  || 71–55|| W4
|- style="text-align:center; background-color:#bfb"
| 127 || September 15 || Mobile|| 8–2||Sitton (5–4) || Fisher ||  ||Sulphur Dell||  || 72–55|| W5
|- style="text-align:center; background-color:#bfb"
| 128 || September 16 || Mobile || 10–1 ||Perdue (17–11) ||  ||  ||Sulphur Dell||  || 73–55|| W6
|- style="text-align:center; background-color:#fbb;"
| 129 || September 17 ||New Orleans || 1–5 ||Bartley ||Bernhard (8–5)||  ||Sulphur Dell|| 5,000 || 73–56|| L1
|- style="text-align:center; background-color:#bfb;"
| 130 || September 18 ||New Orleans || 6–2 ||Duggan (19–11)|| Phillips ||  ||Sulphur Dell|| 5,000 || 74–56|| W1
|- style="text-align:center; background-color:#bfb;"
| 131 || September 19 || New Orleans || 1–0 ||Sitton (6–4)|| Breitenstein||  ||Sulphur Dell|| 10,700 || 75–56|| W2
|-

|-
| Legend:       = Win       = Loss       = No decisionBold = Vols team memberReference:

Game summaries

April

Opening day 
Sportswriter and Vanderbilt baseball coach Grantland Rice accompanied the team to Atlanta. President Kuhn ordered a line score hung up on a slate board outside Sulphur Dell, for local fans to follow the game.

June

Mike McCormick leaves 
On June 15, team captain Mike McCormick had a heated exchange with fans and ultimately abandoned the team.

Despite this, the Vols changed the team and went on a winning streak as a result. On June 20 in an 8–0 win over Montgomery, Butler hit a then-rare, outside-the-park home run.

July

Seventeen inning contest 
The seventeen-inning game on July 9 against Mobile was declared a tie. Both pitchers received praise, and Hamilton Love wrote Perdue "has done more than any one man to hold up the team."

August

Carl Sitton's debut 
On August 7, Southern Association rookie Sitton debuted against the Crackers, winning a close game 2–1 and striking out eight.

September

Hub Perdue's doubleheader 
On September 3, Hub Perdue pitched a shutout until the final inning, when he let a run across. He then insisted on pitching the second game of a doubleheader, and pitched a shut-out win.

John Duggan's no-hitter 
On September 10, Nashville's John Duggan pitched a no-hitter, the second in team history, against the Little Rock Travelers at Sulphur Dell. Only two Little Rock batters reached base, one via walk and another on a fielding error. Nashville's Pryor McElveen, who had earlier misplayed the ball at third, drove in Doc Wiseman in the sixth inning for the only run of the game, a 1–0 win.

Last game vs. New Orleans 
According to one account, "By one run, by one point, Nashville has won the Southern League pennant, nosing New Orleans out literally by an eyelash. Saturday's game, which was the deciding one, between Nashville and New Orleans was the greatest exhibition of the national game ever seen in the south and the finish in the league race probably sets a record in baseball history".

Carl Sitton's spitball defeated Ted Breitenstein 1–0 in the "Greatest Game". Sitton pitched a complete-game, nine-strikeout, four-hit, shutout.

Nashville scored in the bottom of the seventh inning. With two outs, catcher Ed Hurlburt hit a single. Then Sitton did too. Harry "Deerfoot" Bay bunted perfectly down the third base line to load the bases, Bay's fondest memory in his long baseball career. Doc Wiseman then drove in the winning run. Sitton was thrown out at home after Hurlburt scored. The time of the game was one hour and forty-two minutes.

Standings

Season standings 

Source:

Record vs. opponents 

Source:

Roster 

Twenty-four players competed for the Vols over the course of the season. Of these, Daubert, Butler, Wiseman, Perdue, and Sitton were named by Nashville Banner sportswriters Fred Russell and George Leonard to an all-time team consisting of top Nashville players from 1901 to 1919.

Player stats

Batting

Starters 
Note: G = Games played; AB = At bats; R = Runs; H = Hits; AVG = Batting average; SLG = Slugging percentage; SB = Stolen bases

Others

Pitchers 

Source:

Pitching

Starting pitchers 
Note: G = Games pitched; W = Wins; L = Losses; W% = Winning percentage

Other pitchers 

Source:

Notes

References 
Specific

General
 

1908 in sports in Tennessee
Nashville Vols